The Magic House is a 1939 Czechoslovak drama film directed by Otakar Vávra.

Cast
 Adina Mandlová as Marie Ungrová
 Růžena Nasková as Vilemína Balvínová
 Leopolda Dostalová as Aunt Hedvika Balvínová
 Terezie Brzková as Aunt Anna Balvínová
 Zdeněk Štěpánek as Martin Balvín
 Eduard Kohout as Vilém Balvín
 Svetla Svozilová as Rosa
 František Kreuzmann as Magician Caligari
 Karel Dostal as Rudolf Unger, general director

References

External links
 

1939 films
1939 drama films
1930s Czech-language films
Czechoslovak black-and-white films
Films directed by Otakar Vávra
Czechoslovak drama films
1930s Czech films